In mathematics, the Ince equation, named for Edward Lindsay Ince,  is the differential equation

When p is a non-negative integer, it has polynomial solutions called Ince polynomials.

See also

Whittaker–Hill equation
Ince–Gaussian beam

References

Ordinary differential equations